Joseph Medill Patterson (January 6, 1879 – May 26, 1946) was an American journalist, publisher and founder of the Daily News in New York. At the time of his death the Daily News maintained a Sunday circulation of 4.5 million copies, the largest circulation of any paper in the United States.

Early life and education

Joseph Medill Patterson was born into a newspaper family. His mother, the former Elinor Medill, was a daughter of Joseph Medill, founder of the Chicago Tribune and a mayor of Chicago, Illinois. His father, Robert Wilson Patterson Jr., was himself a journalist at the Tribune.

As a scion of a millionaire family, Joseph received a top-flight education, attending Yale University. He briefly left school to report on the Boxer Rebellion in China as a foreign correspondent for the Tribune, returning in time to complete his studies and graduate from Yale in 1901.

Career
Joseph Medill Patterson became one of the most significant newspaper publishers in the United States, founding New York's Daily News and introducing the tabloid. He  was groomed to follow in the footsteps of his famous grandfather. His mother, Elinor ("Nellie"), and his aunt, Kate, both named their firstborn sons after their famous father. As a young adult, he asked his father if he could go to China to cover the Boxer Rebellion. Granted permission, he went as a correspondent for William Randolph Hearst but did not arrive in time. He attended Yale University, where he was a member of Scroll and Key.

Upon graduation, he returned to Chicago, and covered the police beat for the Chicago Tribune. Patterson served in the Illinois House of Representatives as a Republican in 1903 and 1904, married and was the father of three daughters by 1906. The youngest, Alicia, explained, "He had wanted a boy, instead of three daughters in succession, and that meant one of the Patterson girls would have to be his substitute son." Nearly 20 years later, in 1923, after his three daughters had become young women, his mistress (and future wife) gave birth to his only son, James Joseph Patterson, in England.

Joseph Medill Patterson feuded with his father and resigned from the Tribune. Patterson moved to a farm in the country, wrote a socialist novel, A Little Brother of the Rich (1908), and published a muckraking article in Collier's magazine.
Patterson returned to work at the Tribune by 1910. During World War I he went to Europe with Tribune cameraman Edwin F. Weigle to film the newsreel that would be used in the World War I propaganda film The German Side of the War. Screenings of The German Side of the War sold out at theaters. It was one of the only American propaganda films to show the war from Germany's perspective.

After his father died, Patterson took over the management of the Tribune. He had a dispute about how to run the Tribune with his cousin, Robert R. McCormick. After World War I ended, he visited London and observed a newspaper in tabloid form for the first time.  Patterson moved to New York City and founded the New York Daily News as a tabloid on June 26, 1919, with McCormick as co-editor and publisher.  However, the two were unable to resolve their dispute, so in 1925 Patterson ceded full authority over the Tribune to McCormick in return for full control of the Daily News.

Initially, the Daily News was somewhat more liberal than the Tribune.  However, over the years, it became more conservative as Patterson drifted rightward.

Comic strips
He took a hands-on approach to managing the Chicago Tribune Syndicate, distributor for his papers' comic strips. In 1921, he suggested the lead character of Gasoline Alley adopt a foundling child who became Skeezix, a central character in the strip. Patterson influenced Chester Gould's 1931 strip Dick Tracy, changing the title from Plainclothes Tracy, and he supported Gould's vision of a technical, grotesque and violent style of storytelling. Milton Caniff credited Patterson for suggesting a comic strip about the Orient, which led to the creation of Caniff's 1934 strip, Terry and the Pirates.

Caniff recounted Patterson's role in creating Terry in a Time profile, "Escape Artist" (Monday, January 13, 1947):
Patterson... stared coldly at Caniff and asked: "Ever do anything on the Orient?" Caniff hadn't. "You know," Joe Patterson mused, "adventure can still happen out there. There could be a beautiful lady pirate, the kind men fall for." In a few days Caniff was back with samples and 50 proposed titles; Patterson circled Terry and scribbled beside it and the Pirates.

Another item of Patterson comic strip lore is that he rejected Dale Messick's strip Brenda Starr in 1940 because he "had tried a woman cartoonist once... and wanted no more of them." Patterson's assistant, Mollie Slott—later the vice president of the syndicate—saw the discarded samples, and encouraged Messick to change Brenda from a "girl bandit" to a reporter. Patterson grudgingly accepted the strip, but ran it in the Chicago Tribune's Sunday comic section, rather than the daily paper. He refused to run it in the Daily News, which finally carried Brenda Starr, Reporter in 1948, two years after Patterson's death.

Legacy
His son, James, would serve as vice president and assistant managing editor of the Daily News. One of Patterson's grandsons, Joseph Albright, was married to future US Secretary of State Madeleine Albright for about 23 years. Patterson is buried in Arlington National Cemetery.

Family tree

References

Further reading
 Olmsted, Kathryn S. The Newspaper Axis: Six Press Barons Who Enabled Hitler (Yale UP, 2022)online also online review

External links
The Nickelodeons, an article written by Patterson and published in the November 23, 1907 issue of The Saturday Evening Post
France, written by Patterson, from Great Poems of the World War, published in 1922
Photos of his grave in Arlington National Cemetery

1879 births
1946 deaths
American male journalists
Journalists from New York City
Medill-Patterson family
20th-century American newspaper founders
Businesspeople from Chicago
Businesspeople from New York City
Yale University alumni
Burials at Arlington National Cemetery
Old Right (United States)
Republican Party members of the Illinois House of Representatives